The 1822–23 United States House of Representatives elections were held on various dates in various states between July 1, 1822 and August 14, 1823. Each state set its own date for its elections to the House of Representatives before the first session of the 18th United States Congress convened on December 1, 1823. They occurred during President James Monroe's second term.

Following the congressional reapportionment based on the 1820 United States Census, the House increased by 26 seats to a total of 213. Most relative population growth was in the West. This was the last House election during the virtually nonpartisan Era of Good Feelings and the largest midterm gain of seats by a President's party.  The Democratic-Republican Party remained nationally dominant, and the Federalist Party limited to state and local influence.

This election heralded key change not apparent until the end of the 18th Congress.  The four-way 1824 presidential election, in which all candidates ran as Democratic-Republicans, would result in no candidate winning an Electoral College majority. Representatives elected to the 18th Congress are often classified by how they voted in the 1825 contingent election, which after a controversial, unanticipated political deal chose John Quincy Adams President, triggering a new, rancorous, abruptly realigned period of partisanship.

This election marked the second time in American history where the incumbent president's party gained House seats in a midterm election while still losing seats in the Senate, this happened before in 1814 and again in 1902.

Election summaries

Following the 1820 Census, 26 new seats were apportioned, with 4 States losing 1 seat each, 9 States gaining between 1 and 8 seats, and the remaining 11 States having no change in apportionment.

Special elections 

There were special elections in 1822 and 1823 to the 17th United States Congress and 18th United States Congress.

Special elections are sorted by date then district.

17th Congress 

|-
! 
| Solomon Van Rensselaer
|  | Federalist
| 1818
| nowrap | 

|-
! 
| Caesar A. Rodney
|  | Democratic-Republican
| 18021804 1820
|  | Incumbent resigned January 24, 1822 when elected U.S. Senator.New member elected October 1, 1822.Federalist gain.Successor seated December 2, 1822.Successor retired when the seat was eliminated.
| nowrap | 

|-
! 
| William Milnor
|  | Federalist
| 18061810 18141816 1820
| nowrap | 

|-
! 
| Samuel Moore
|  | Democratic-Republican
| 1818 
| nowrap | 

|-
! 
| Henry Baldwin
|  | Democratic-Republican
| 1816
| nowrap | 

|-
! 
| Thomas Van Swearingen
|  | Federalist
| 1819
| nowrap | 

|-
! 
| Ezekiel Whitman
|  | Federalist
| 1808 (in Mass.)1810 1816 (in Mass.)1820 (Maine)
|  | Incumbent resigned June 1, 1822.New member elected between June and December 1822.Democratic-Republican gain.Successor seated December 2, 1822.Successor was not a candidate to the next term, see below.
| nowrap | 

|-
! 
| William Hendricks
|  | Democratic-Republican
| 1816
| nowrap | 

|-
! 
| James Overstreet
|  | Democratic-Republican
| 1818
|  | Incumbent died May 24, 1822.Successor also elected to the next term.New member elected in October 1822.Democratic-Republican hold.Successor seated December 4, 1822.Successor later re-elected, see below.
| nowrap | 

|-
! 
| Ludwig Worman
|  | Federalist
| 1820
|  | Incumbent died October 17, 1822.New member elected December 10, 1822.Democratic-Republican gain.Successor seated December 23, 1822.Successor had already been elected to the next term, see below.
| nowrap | 

|-
! 
| James Blair
|  | Democratic-Republican
| 1821 
| nowrap | 

|-
! 
| William Lowndes
|  | Democratic-Republican
| 1812
|  | Incumbent died October 27, 1822.New member elected December 13, 1822.Democratic-Republican hold.Successor seated January 6, 1823.Successor later re-elected, see below.
| nowrap | 

|-
! 
| Samuel Smith
|  | Democratic-Republican
| 17921816
|  | Incumbent re-elected (see below) but resigned December 22, 1822.New member elected January 1, 1823.Democratic-Republican hold.Successor also elected the same day to the next term, see below.Successor seated January 8, 1823.
| nowrap | 

|}

18th Congress 

|-
! 
| Samuel Smith
|  | Democratic-Republican
| 17921816
|  | Incumbent re-elected (see below) but resigned December 22, 1822.New member elected January 1, 1823.Democratic-Republican hold.Successor also elected the same day to finish the term, see above.Successor seated with the rest of the House at the December 1, 1823 beginning of the first session.
| nowrap | 

|-
! 
| William Eustis
|  | Democratic-Republican
| 18001804 1820 18201822
|  | Incumbent re-elected (see below) but declined the election.New member elected September 8, 1823.Democratic-Republican hold.Election was challenged and successor was not seated, leading to a new election.
| nowrap | 

|-
! 
| William B. Rochester
|  | Adams Democratic-Republican
| 1821
|  | Incumbent resigned April 21, 1823 to become Judge of the New York's Eighth Circuit Court.New member elected in November 1823.Democratic-Republican hold.Successor was seated with the rest of the House at the December 1, 1823 beginning of the first session.
| nowrap | 

|}

Alabama 

Alabama increased from one to three seats in reapportionment following the 1820 United States Census.  The state then changed from a single at-large district to three geographic districts. Alabama elected its members August 3, 1823, after the term began but before the new Congress convened.

|-
! 
| Gabriel Moore
|  | Democratic-Republican
| 1821
| Incumbent re-elected.
| nowrap | 

|-
! 
| colspan=3 | None (District created)
|  | New seat.New member elected.Democratic-Republican gain.
| nowrap | 

|-
! 
| colspan=3 | None (District created)
|  | New seat.New member elected.Democratic-Republican gain.
| nowrap | 

|}

Arkansas Territory 
See Non-voting delegates, below.

Connecticut 

Connecticut lost one seat in reapportionment following the 1820 United States Census. Connecticut elected its members April 7, 1823, after the term began but before the new Congress convened.

|-
! rowspan=7 | 
| Noyes Barber
|  | Democratic-Republican
| 1821
| Incumbent re-elected.
| rowspan=6 nowrap | 

|-
| Ebenezer Stoddard
|  | Democratic-Republican
| 1821
| Incumbent re-elected.

|-
| Gideon Tomlinson
|  | Democratic-Republican
| 1818
| Incumbent re-elected.

|-
| Ansel Sterling
|  | Democratic-Republican
| 1821
| Incumbent re-elected.

|-
| John Russ
|  | Democratic-Republican
| 1818
|  | Incumbent lost re-election.New member elected.Democratic-Republican hold.

|-
| Henry W. Edwards
|  | Democratic-Republican
| 1818
|  | Incumbent lost re-election.New member elected.Democratic-Republican hold.

|-
| Daniel Burrows
|  | Democratic-Republican
| 1821
|  colspan=2 | Incumbent lost re-election.Seat eliminated.Democratic-Republican loss.

|}

Delaware 

Delaware was reduced once more from two back to one seat after the Fourth Census, which number has remained constant to the present day. At the time of the October 1, 1822 election, the second seat in Delaware's at-large district was vacant, so there was only one incumbent going into the election.

|-
! rowspan=2 | 
| Louis McLane
|  | Federalist
| 1816
| Incumbent re-elected.
| rowspan=2 nowrap | 

|-
| Caesar A. Rodney
|  | Democratic-Republican
| 18021804 1820
|  | Incumbent resigned January 24, 1822 when elected U.S. Senator.Successor was only elected to finish the term (see above) as the seat was eliminated.Democratic-Republican loss.

|}

Florida Territory 
See Non-voting delegates, below.

Georgia 

Georgia gained one seat in reapportionment following the 1820 United States Census. Georgia elected its members October 7, 1822.

|-
! rowspan=7 | 
| Alfred Cuthbert
|  | Democratic-Republican
| 1813 1816 1820
| Incumbent re-elected.
| rowspan=7 nowrap | 

|-
| George R. Gilmer
|  | Democratic-Republican
| 1820
|  | Incumbent retired.New member elected.Democratic-Republican hold.

|-
| Joel Abbot
|  | Democratic-Republican
| 1816
| Incumbent re-elected.

|-
| Edward F. Tattnall
|  | Democratic-Republican
| 1820
| Incumbent re-elected.

|-
| Robert R. Reid
|  | Democratic-Republican
| 1819 
|  | Incumbent retired.New member elected.Democratic-Republican hold.

|-
| Wiley Thompson
|  | Democratic-Republican
| 1820
| Incumbent re-elected.

|-
| colspan=3 | None (District created)
|  | New seat.New member elected.Democratic-Republican gain.

|}

Illinois 

Illinois elected its sole at-large member August 5, 1822.

|-
! 
| Daniel P. Cook
|  | Democratic-Republican
| 1819
| Incumbent re-elected.
| nowrap | 

|}

Indiana 

Indiana gained two seats in reapportionment following the 1820 United States Census, and elected its members August 5, 1822.

Indiana's single at-large seat in the 17th Congress was empty at the time of the election, previous incumbent William Hendricks (Democratic-Republican) having resigned to run for Governor of Indiana. Jonathan Jennings (Jackson Democratic-Republican), elected to the new , was elected in the ensuing special election to fill the at-large district for the remainder of the 17th Congress.

|-
! 
| colspan=3 | None (District created)
|  | New seat.New member elected.Democratic-Republican gain.
| nowrap | 

|-
! 
| colspan=3 | None (District created)
|  | New seat.New member elected.Democratic-Republican gain.Successor also elected the same day to finish the term in the expiring , see above.
| nowrap | 

|-
! 
| William Hendricks
|  | Democratic-Republican
| 1816
|  | Incumbent resigned July 25, 1822 to run for Governor of Indiana.New member elected.Democratic-Republican gain.
| nowrap | 

|}

Kentucky 

Kentucky gained two seats in reapportionment following the 1820 United States Census. Kentucky elected its members August 5, 1822.

|-
! 
| David Trimble
|  | Democratic-Republican
| 1816
| Incumbent re-elected.
| nowrap | 

|-
! 
| Thomas Metcalfe
|  | Democratic-Republican
| 1818
| Incumbent re-elected.
| nowrap | 

|-
! 
| colspan=3 | None (District created)
|  | New seat.New member elected.Democratic-Republican gain.
| nowrap | 

|-
! 
| John S. Smith
|  | Democratic-Republican
| 1821 
|  | Incumbent lost re-election.New member elected.Democratic-Republican hold.
| nowrap | 

|-
! 
| John T. Johnson
|  | Democratic-Republican
| 1820
| Incumbent re-elected.
| nowrap | 

|-
! 
| colspan=3 | None (District created)
|  | New seat.New member elected.Adams Republican gain.
| nowrap | 

|-
! 
| Samuel H. Woodson
|  | Democratic-Republican
| 1820
|  | Incumbent lost re-election.New member elected.Democratic-Republican hold.
| nowrap | 

|-
! 
| colspan=3 | None (District created)
|  | New seat.New member elected.Adams Republican gain.
| nowrap | 

|-
! 
| James D. Breckinridge
|  | Democratic-Republican
| 1821 
|  | Incumbent lost re-election.New member elected.Democratic-Republican hold.
| nowrap | 

|-
! 
| Francis Johnson
|  | Democratic-Republican
| 1820
| Incumbent re-elected.
| nowrap | 

|-
! 
| colspan=3 | None (District created)
|  | New seat.New member elected.Democratic-Republican gain.
| nowrap | 

|-
! 
| colspan=3 | None (District created)
|  | New seat.New member elected.Democratic-Republican gain.
| nowrap | 

|}

Louisiana 

Louisiana gained two seats in reapportionment following the 1820 United States Census. Louisiana elected its members July 1–3, 1822.

|-
! 
| colspan=3 | None (District created)
|  | New seat.New member elected.Democratic-Republican gain.
| nowrap | 

|-
! 
| colspan=3 | None (District created)
|  | New seat.New member elected.Democratic-Republican gain.
| nowrap | 

|-
! 
| Josiah S. Johnston
|  | Democratic-Republican
| 1820
|  | Incumbent lost re-election.New member elected.Democratic-Republican hold.
| nowrap | 

|}

Maine 

Maine elected its members April 7, 1823, after the term began but before the new Congress convened. Maine law required a majority for election, with additional ballots taken if a majority were not achieved.

|-
! 
| Joseph Dane
|  | Federalist
| 1820 
|  | Incumbent retired.New member elected.Democratic-Republican gain.
| nowrap | 

|-
! 
| Mark Harris
|  | Democratic-Republican
| 1822 
|  | Incumbent retired.New member elected.Federalist gain.
| nowrap | 

|-
! rowspan=2 | 
| Ebenezer Herrick
|  | Democratic-Republican
| 1820
| Incumbent re-elected.
| rowspan=2 nowrap | 

|-
| Mark Langdon Hill
|  | Democratic-Republican
| 1819
|  | Incumbent lost re-election.Democratic-Republican loss.

|-
! 
| Joshua Cushman
|  | Democratic-Republican
| 1818
| Incumbent re-elected.
| nowrap | 

|-
! 
| Enoch Lincoln
|  | Democratic-Republican
| 1818 
| Incumbent re-elected.
| nowrap | 

|-
! 
| colspan=3 | None (District created)
|  | New seat.New member elected.Democratic-Republican gain.
| nowrap | 

|-
! 
| William D. Williamson
|  | Democratic-Republican
| 1820
|  | Incumbent lost re-election.New member elected.Democratic-Republican hold.
| nowrap | 

|}

Maryland 

Maryland elected its members October 7, 1822.

|-
! 
| Raphael Neale
|  | Federalist
| 1818
| Incumbent re-elected.
| nowrap | 

|-
! 
| Joseph Kent
|  | Democratic-Republican
| 1818
| Incumbent re-elected.
| nowrap | 

|-
! 
| Henry R. Warfield
|  | Federalist
| 1818
| Incumbent re-elected.
| nowrap | 

|-
! 
| John Nelson
|  | Democratic-Republican
| 1820
|  | Incumbent retired.New member elected.Federalist gain.
| nowrap | 

|-
! rowspan=2 | 
| Peter Little
|  | Democratic-Republican
| 18101812 1816
| Incumbent re-elected.
| rowspan=2 nowrap | 

|-
| Samuel Smith
|  | Democratic-Republican
| 17921803 1816
| Incumbent re-elected but resigned December 22, 1822, leading to a pair of special elections for the current and next congresses.

|-
! 
| Philip Reed
|  | Democratic-Republican
| 18161818 1820
|  | Incumbent lost re-election.New member elected.Democratic-Republican hold.
| nowrap | 

|-
! 
| Robert Wright
|  | Democratic-Republican
| 18101816 1820
|  | Incumbent retired.New member elected.Democratic-Republican hold.
| nowrap | 

|-
! 
| Thomas Bayly
|  | Federalist
| 1816
|  | Incumbent retired.New member elected.Democratic-Republican gain.
| nowrap | 

|}

Massachusetts 

Massachusetts elected its members November 4, 1822. Massachusetts law required a majority for election, which was not met in 3 districts, necessitating additional elections on March 3, 1823 and May 12, 1823; nevertheless, all elections were complete before the new Congress convened.

District numbers differed between source used and elsewhere on Wikipedia; district numbers used elsewhere on Wikipedia used here.

|-
! 
| Benjamin Gorham
|  | Federalist
| 1820
|  | Incumbent retired.New member elected.Federalist hold.
| nowrap | 

|-
! 
| Gideon Barstow
|  | Democratic-Republican
| 1821
|  | Incumbent retired.New member elected.Democratic-Republican hold.
| nowrap | 

|-
! 
| Jeremiah Nelson
|  | Federalist
| 18041806 1814
| Incumbent re-elected.
| nowrap | 

|-
! 
| Timothy Fuller
|  | Democratic-Republican
| 1816
| Incumbent re-elected.
| nowrap | 

|-
! 
| Jonathan Russell
|  | Democratic-Republican
| 1820
|  | Incumbent retired.New member elected.Democratic-Republican hold.
| nowrap | 

|-
! 
| Lewis Bigelow
|  | Federalist
| 1820
|  | Incumbent lost re-election.New member elected.Democratic-Republican gain.
| nowrap | 

|-
! 
| Samuel C. Allen
|  | Federalist
| 1816
| Incumbent re-elected.
| nowrap | 

|-
! 
| Samuel Lathrop
|  | Federalist
| 1819
| Incumbent re-elected.
| nowrap | 

|-
! 
| Henry W. Dwight
|  | Federalist
| 1820
| Incumbent re-elected.
| nowrap | 

|-
! 
| William Eustis
|  | Democratic-Republican
| 18001804 1820 1820
| Incumbent re-elected but declined the seat to become Governor of Massachusetts, leading to a special election.
| nowrap | 

|-
! 
| Aaron Hobart
|  | Democratic-Republican
| 1820
| Incumbent re-elected.
| nowrap | 

|-
! 
| Francis Baylies
|  | Federalist
| 1820
| Incumbent re-elected.
| nowrap | 

|-
! 
| John Reed Jr.
|  | Federalist
| 18121816 1820
| Incumbent re-elected.
| nowrap | 

|}

Michigan Territory 
See Non-voting delegates, below.

Mississippi 

Mississippi elected its member August 5–6, 1822.

|-
! 
| Christopher Rankin
|  | Democratic-Republican
| 1819
| Incumbent re-elected.
| nowrap | 

|}

Missouri 

Missouri elected its member October 7, 1822.

|-
! 
| John Scott
|  | Democratic-Republican
| 1820
| Incumbent re-elected.
| nowrap | 

|}

New Hampshire 

New Hampshire elected its members August 26, 1822. New Hampshire law required a candidate to receive votes from a majority of voters for election, that is 1/12 of votes. Only five candidates received the requisite majority, and so a May 11, 1823 run-off election was held for the sixth seat.

|-
! rowspan=6 | 
| Josiah Butler
|  | Democratic-Republican
| 1816
|  | Incumbent retired.New member elected.Democratic-Republican hold.
| rowspan=6 nowrap | : : 

|-
| Nathaniel Upham
|  | Democratic-Republican
| 1816
|  | Incumbent retired.New member elected.Democratic-Republican hold.

|-
| Matthew Harvey
|  | Democratic-Republican
| 1820
| Incumbent re-elected.

|-
| Aaron Matson
|  | Democratic-Republican
| 1820
| Incumbent re-elected.

|-
| William Plumer Jr.
|  | Democratic-Republican
| 1818
| Incumbent re-elected.

|-
| Thomas Whipple Jr.
|  | Democratic-Republican
| 1820
| Incumbent re-elected.

|}

New Jersey 

New Jersey elected its members October 15, 1822.

|-
! rowspan=6 | 
| George Holcombe
|  | Democratic-Republican
| 1820
| Incumbent re-elected.
| rowspan=6 nowrap | 

|-
| George Cassedy
|  | Democratic-Republican
| 1820
| Incumbent re-elected.

|-
| Lewis Condict
|  | Democratic-Republican
| 1821 
| Incumbent re-elected.

|-
| Samuel Swan
|  | Democratic-Republican
| 1820
| Incumbent re-elected.

|-
| James Matlack
|  | Democratic-Republican
| 1820
| Incumbent re-elected.

|-
| Ephraim Bateman
|  | Democratic-Republican
| 1814
|  | Incumbent lost re-election.New member elected.Democratic-Republican hold.

|}

New York 

New York's representation increased after the 1820 United States Census from 27 to 34 seats, elected from 30 districts, two with two members each, and one with three members. New York elected its members November 4–6, 1822.

As in the previous election, the Democratic-Republican Party in New York was divided into two factions, the "Bucktails" and the Clintonians, which distinction is not marked here. The Clintonians and the Federalists ran on a joint ticket in 1822 as in 1821, in some cases, it's unclear which party a candidate belonged to, those are marked Crawford Federalist.

|-
! 
| Silas Wood
|  | Federalist
| 1818
|  | Re-electedas Democratic-Republican
| nowrap | 

|-
! 
| colspan=3 | None (District created)
|  | New seat.New member elected.Democratic-Republican gain.
| nowrap | 

|-
! rowspan=3 | 
| John J. Morgan
|  | Democratic-Republican
| 1821
| Incumbent re-elected.
| rowspan=3 nowrap | 

|-
| Churchill C. Cambreleng
|  | Democratic-Republican
| 1821
| Incumbent re-elected.

|-
| colspan=3 | None (Seat created)
|  | New seat.New member elected.Democratic-Republican gain.

|-
! 
| colspan=3 | None (Seat created)
|  | New seat.New member elected.Democratic-Republican gain.
| nowrap | 

|-
! 
| William W. Van Wyck
|  | Democratic-Republican
| 1821
| Incumbent re-elected.
| nowrap | 

|-
! 
| colspan=3 | None (District created)
|  | New seat.New member elected.Democratic-Republican gain.
| nowrap | 

|-
! 
| Charles H. Ruggles
|  | Federalist
| 1821
|  | Incumbent lost re-election.New member elected.Democratic-Republican gain.
| nowrap | 

|-
! 
| colspan=3 | None (District created)
|  | New seat.New member elected.Federalist gain.
| nowrap | 

|-
! 
| John D. Dickinson
|  | Federalist
| 1818
|  | Incumbent lost re-election.New member elected.Democratic-Republican gain.
| nowrap | 

|-
! 
| Stephen Van Rensselaer
|  | Federalist
| 1822 
| Incumbent re-elected.
| nowrap | 

|-
! 
| colspan=3 | None (District created)
|  | New seat.New member elected.Democratic-Republican gain.
| nowrap | 

|-
! 
| colspan=3 | None (District created)
|  | New seat.New member elected.Democratic-Republican gain.
| nowrap | 

|-
! 
| colspan=3 | None (District created)
|  | New seat.New member elected.Democratic-Republican gain.
| nowrap | 

|-
! 
| colspan=3 | None (District created)
|  | New seat.New member elected.Federalist gain.
| nowrap | 

|-
! 
| colspan=3 | None (District created)
|  | New seat.New member elected.Democratic-Republican gain.
| nowrap | 

|-
! 
| colspan=3 | None (District created)
|  | New seat.New member elected.Democratic-Republican gain.
| nowrap | 

|-
! 
| John W. Taylor
|  | Democratic-Republican
| 1812
| Incumbent re-elected.
| nowrap | 

|-
! 
| colspan=3 | None (District created)
|  | New seat.New member elected.Democratic-Republican gain.
| nowrap | 

|-
! 
| colspan=3 | None (District created)
|  | New seat.New member elected.Democratic-Republican gain.
| nowrap | 

|-
! rowspan=2 | 
| colspan=3 | None (District created)
|  | New seat.New member elected.Democratic-Republican gain.
| rowspan=2 nowrap | 

|-
| colspan=3 | None (District created)
|  | New seat.New member elected.Democratic-Republican gain.

|-
! 
| Samuel Campbell
|  | Democratic-Republican
| 1821
|  | Incumbent lost re-election.New member elected.Democratic-Republican hold.
| nowrap | 

|-
! 
| colspan=3 | None (District created)
|  | New seat.New member elected.Democratic-Republican gain.
| nowrap | 

|-
! 
| Elisha Litchfield
|  | Democratic-Republican
| 1821
| Incumbent re-elected.
| nowrap | 

|-
! 
| colspan=3 | None (District created)
|  | New seat.New member elected.Democratic-Republican gain.
| nowrap | 

|-
! 
| David Woodcock
|  | Democratic-Republican
| 1821
|  | Incumbent lost re-election.New member elected.Democratic-Republican hold.
| nowrap | 

|-
! rowspan=2 | 
| colspan=3 | None (District created)
|  | New seat.New member elected.Democratic-Republican gain.
| rowspan=2 nowrap | 

|-
| colspan=3 | None (District created)
|  | New seat.New member elected.Democratic-Republican gain.

|-
! 
| colspan=3 | None (District created)
|  | New seat.New member elected.Democratic-Republican gain.
| nowrap | 

|-
! 
| William B. Rochester
|  | Democratic-Republican
| 1821
| Incumbent re-elected but resigned April 21, 1823, leading to a special election.
| nowrap | 

|-
! 
| colspan=3 | None (District created)
|  | New seat.New member elected.Democratic-Republican gain.Election was later successfully challenged and a new winner would be seated in 1824.
| nowrap | 

|-
! 
| Albert H. Tracy
|  | Democratic-Republican
| 1818
| Incumbent re-elected.
| nowrap | 

|}

North Carolina 

North Carolina's delegation remained unchanged after the census, at thirteen seats. North Carolina elected its members August 14, 1823, after the term began but before the new Congress convened.

|-
! 
| Lemuel Sawyer
|  | Democratic-Republican
| 18061813 1817
|  | Incumbent lost re-election.New member elected.Democratic-Republican hold.
| nowrap | 

|-
! 
| Hutchins G. Burton
|  | Democratic-Republican
| 1819
| Incumbent re-elected.
| nowrap | 

|-
! 
| Thomas H. Hall
|  | Democratic-Republican
| 1817
| Incumbent re-elected.
| nowrap | 

|-
! 
| William S. Blackledge
|  | Democratic-Republican
| 1821
|  | Incumbent retired.New member elected.Democratic-Republican hold.
| nowrap | 

|-
! 
| Charles Hooks
|  | Democratic-Republican
| 1816 1817 1819
| Incumbent re-elected.
| nowrap | 

|-
! 
| Weldon N. Edwards
|  | Democratic-Republican
| 1816 
| Incumbent re-elected.
| nowrap | 

|-
! 
| Archibald McNeill
|  | Federalist
| 1821
|  | Incumbent retired.New member elected.Federalist hold.
| nowrap | 

|-
! 
| Josiah Crudup
|  | Democratic-Republican
| 1821
|  | Incumbent retired.New member elected.Democratic-Republican hold.
| nowrap | 

|-
! 
| Romulus M. Saunders
|  | Democratic-Republican
| 1821
| Incumbent re-elected.
| nowrap | 

|-
! 
| John Long
|  | Democratic-Republican
| 1821
| Incumbent re-elected.
| nowrap | 

|-
! 
| Henry W. Connor
|  | Democratic-Republican
| 1821
| Incumbent re-elected.
| nowrap | 

|-
! 
| Felix Walker
|  | Democratic-Republican
| 1817
|  | Incumbent lost re-election.New member elected.Democratic-Republican hold.
| nowrap | 

|-
! 
| Lewis Williams
|  | Democratic-Republican
| 1815
| Incumbent re-elected.
| nowrap | 

|}

Ohio 

Ohio gained eight seats in reapportionment following the 1820 United States Census. Ohio elected its members October 8, 1822.

|-
! 
| colspan=3 | None (District created)
|  | New seat.New member elected.Democratic-Republican gain.
| nowrap | 

|-
! 
| Thomas R. Ross
|  | Democratic-Republican
| 1818
| Incumbent re-elected.
| nowrap | 

|-
! 
| colspan=3 | None (District created)
|  | New seat.New member elected.Democratic-Republican gain.
| nowrap | 

|-
! 
| Joseph Vance
|  | Democratic-Republican
| 1820
| Incumbent re-elected.
| nowrap | 

|-
! 
| John W. Campbell
|  | Democratic-Republican
| 1816
| Incumbent re-elected.
| nowrap | 

|-
! 
| colspan=3 | None (District created)
|  | New seat.New member elected.Democratic-Republican gain.
| nowrap | 

|-
! 
| Levi Barber
|  | Democratic-Republican
| 18161818 1820
|  | Incumbent lost re-election.New member elected.Democratic-Republican hold.
| nowrap | 

|-
! 
| colspan=3 | None (District created)
|  | New seat.New member elected.Democratic-Republican gain.
| nowrap | 

|-
! 
| David Chambers
|  | Democratic-Republican
| 1821 
|  | Incumbent lost re-election.New member elected.Democratic-Republican hold.
| nowrap | 

|-
! 
| colspan=3 | None (District created)
|  | New seat.New member elected.Democratic-Republican gain.
| nowrap | 

|-
! 
| colspan=3 | None (District created)
|  | New seat.New member elected.Democratic-Republican gain.
| nowrap | 

|-
! 
| John Sloane
|  | Democratic-Republican
| 1818
| Incumbent re-elected.
| nowrap | 

|-
! 
| colspan=3 | None (District created)
|  | New seat.New member elected.Democratic-Republican gain.
| nowrap | 

|-
! 
| colspan=3 | None (District created)
|  | New seat.New member elected.Democratic-Republican gain.
| nowrap | 

|}

Pennsylvania 

Pennsylvania gained three seats in reapportionment following the 1820 United States Census. Pennsylvania elected its members October 8, 1822.

|-
! 
| colspan=3 | None (District created)
|  | New seat.New member elected.Federalist gain.
| nowrap | 

|-
! 
| Joseph Hemphill
|  | Federalist
| 18001802 1818
| Incumbent re-elected.
| nowrap | 

|-
! 
| Thomas Forrest
|  | Federalist
| 1822 
|  | Incumbent lost re-election.New member elected.Democratic-Republican gain.
| nowrap | 

|-
! rowspan=3 | 
| James Buchanan
|  | Federalist
| 1820
| Incumbent re-elected.
| rowspan=3 nowrap | 

|-
| William Darlington
|  | Democratic-Republican
| 18141816 1818
|  | Incumbent lost re-election.New member elected.Federalist gain.

|-
| Samuel Edwards
|  | Federalist
| 1818
| Incumbent re-elected.

|-
! 
| colspan=3 | None (District created)
|  | New seat.New member elected.Democratic-Republican gain.
| nowrap | 

|-
! 
| John Phillips
|  | Federalist
| 1820
|  | Incumbent lost re-election.New member elected.Democratic-Republican gain.
| nowrap | 

|-
! rowspan=2 | 
| Ludwig Worman
|  | Federalist
| 1820
|  | Incumbent lost re-election.New member elected.Democratic-Republican gain.Incumbent then died October 17, 1822 and winner was also elected December 10, 1822 to begin term early.
| rowspan=2 nowrap | 

|-
| colspan=3 | None (District created)
|  | New seat.New member elected.Democratic-Republican gain.

|-
! rowspan=2 | 
| Samuel D. Ingham
|  | Democratic-Republican
| 1822 
| Incumbent re-elected.
| rowspan=2 nowrap | 

|-
| Thomas J. Rogers
|  | Democratic-Republican
| 1818 
| Incumbent re-elected.

|-
! rowspan=3 | 
| colspan=3 | None (District created)
|  | New seat.New member elected.Federalist gain.
| rowspan=3 nowrap | 

|-
| colspan=3 | None (District created)
|  | New seat.New member elected.Democratic-Republican gain.

|-
| colspan=3 | None (District created)
|  | New seat.New member elected.Democratic-Republican gain.

|-
! 
| James S. Mitchell
|  | Democratic-Republican
| 1820
| Incumbent re-elected.
| nowrap | 

|-
! rowspan=2 | 
| John Findlay
|  | Democratic-Republican
| 1821 
| Incumbent re-elected.
| rowspan=2 nowrap | 

|-
| James McSherry
|  | Democratic-Republican
| 1820
|  | Incumbent lost re-election.New member elected.Democratic-Republican hold.

|-
! 
! John Brown
|  | Democratic-Republican
| 1820
| Incumbent re-elected.
| nowrap | 

|-
! 
| John Tod
|  | Democratic-Republican
| 1820
| Incumbent re-elected.
| nowrap | 

|-
! 
| Andrew Stewart
|  | Democratic-Republican
| 1820
| Incumbent re-elected.
| nowrap | 

|-
! 
| Thomas Patterson
|  | Democratic-Republican
| 1816
| Incumbent re-elected.
| nowrap | 

|-
! rowspan=2 | 
| Walter Forward
|  | Democratic-Republican
| 1822 
|  | New seat.New member elected.Democratic-Republican gain.
| rowspan=2 nowrap | 

|-
| colspan=3 | None (District created)
|  | New seat.New member elected.Democratic-Republican gain.

|-
! 
| George Plumer
|  | Democratic-Republican
| 1820
| Incumbent re-elected.
| nowrap | 

|-
! 
| Patrick Farrelly
|  | Democratic-Republican
| 1820
| Incumbent re-elected.
| nowrap | 

|}

Rhode Island 

Rhode Island elected its members August 27, 1822.

|-
! rowspan=2 | 
| Samuel Eddy
|  | Democratic-Republican
| 1818
| Incumbent re-elected.
| rowspan=2 nowrap | 

|-
| Job Durfee
|  | Democratic-Republican
| 1820
| Incumbent re-elected.

|}

South Carolina 

South Carolina elected its members February 12–13, 1823.

|-
! 
| Joel R. Poinsett
|  | Democratic-Republican
| 1820
| Incumbent re-elected.
| nowrap | 

|-
! 
| James Hamilton Jr.
|  | Democratic-Republican
| 1822 
| Incumbent re-elected.
| nowrap | 

|-
! 
| Thomas R. Mitchell
|  | Democratic-Republican
| 1820
|  | Incumbent lost re-election.New member elected.Democratic-Republican hold.
| nowrap | 

|-
! 
| Andrew R. Govan
|  | Democratic-Republican
| 1822 
| Incumbent re-elected.
| nowrap | 

|-
! 
| George McDuffie
|  | Democratic-Republican
| 1820
| Incumbent re-elected.
| nowrap | 

|-
! 
| John Wilson
|  | Democratic-Republican
| 1820
| Incumbent re-elected.
| nowrap | 

|-
! 
| Joseph Gist
|  | Democratic-Republican
| 1820
| Incumbent re-elected.
| nowrap | 

|-
! 
| John Carter
|  | Democratic-Republican
| 1822 
| Incumbent re-elected.
| nowrap | 

|-
! 
| Starling Tucker
|  | Democratic-Republican
| 1816
| Incumbent re-elected.
| nowrap | 

|}

Tennessee 

Tennessee gained three seats in reapportionment following the 1820 United States Census. Tennessee elected its members August 7–8, 1823, after the term began but before the new Congress convened.

|-
! 
| colspan=3 | None (District created)
|  | New seat.New member elected.Democratic-Republican gain.
| nowrap | 

|-
! 
| John Cocke
|  | Democratic-Republican
| 1819
| Incumbent re-elected.
| nowrap | 

|-
! 
| colspan=3 | None (District created)
|  | New seat.New member elected.Democratic-Republican gain.
| nowrap | 

|-
! 
| colspan=3 | None (District created)
|  | New seat.New member elected.Democratic-Republican gain.
| nowrap | 

|-
! 
| Robert Allen
|  | Democratic-Republican
| 1819
| Incumbent re-elected.
| nowrap | 

|-
! 
| colspan=3 | None (District created)
|  | New seat.New member elected.Democratic-Republican gain.
| nowrap | 

|-
! 
| colspan=3 | None (District created)
|  | New seat.New member elected.Democratic-Republican gain.
| nowrap | 

|-
! 
| colspan=3 | None (District created)
|  | New seat.New member elected.Democratic-Republican gain.
| nowrap | 

|-
! 
| colspan=3 | None (District created)
|  | New seat.New member elected.Democratic-Republican gain.
| nowrap | 

|}

Vermont 

Vermont lost one seat in reapportionment following the 1820 United States Census. For the 1822 election, Vermont switched back to using a single at-large district. This would be the last year that Vermont would use an at-large district until 1932, when its representation was reduced to a single seat. Vermont elected its members September 3, 1822.

|-
! rowspan=6 | 
| Rollin C. Mallary
|  | Democratic-Republican
| 1818
| Incumbent re-elected.
| rowspan=5 nowrap | 

|-
| Phineas White
|  | Democratic-Republican
| 1821
|  | Incumbent lost re-election.New member elected.Democratic-Republican hold.

|-
| Charles Rich
|  | Democratic-Republican
| 18121814 1816
| Incumbent re-elected.

|-
| Elias Keyes
|  | Democratic-Republican
| 1820
|  | Incumbent lost re-election.New member elected.Democratic-Republican hold.

|-
| Samuel C. Crafts
|  | Democratic-Republican
| 1816
| Incumbent re-elected.

|-
| John Mattocks
|  | Democratic-Republican
| 1820
|  colspan=2 | Incumbent lost re-election.Seat eliminated.Democratic-Republican loss.

|}

Virginia 

Virginia lost one seat in reapportionment following the 1820 United States Census. Nineteen incumbents ran for re-election leaving three open seats. Virginia elected its members in April 1823, after the term began but before the new Congress convened.

|-
! 
| Thomas Newton Jr.
|  | Democratic-Republican
| 1797
| Incumbent re-elected.
| nowrap | 

|-
! 
| Arthur Smith
|  | Democratic-Republican
| 1821
| Incumbent re-elected.
| nowrap | 

|-
! 
| William S. Archer
|  | Democratic-Republican
| 1820 
| Incumbent re-elected.
| nowrap | 

|-
! 
| Mark Alexander
|  | Democratic-Republican
| 1819
| Incumbent re-elected.
| nowrap | 

|-
! 
| John Randolph
|  | Democratic-Republican
| 17971819
| Incumbent re-elected.
| nowrap | 

|-
! 
| George Tucker
|  | Democratic-Republican
| 1819
| Incumbent re-elected.
| nowrap | 

|-
! 
| Jabez Leftwich
|  | Democratic-Republican
| 1821
| Incumbent re-elected.
| nowrap | 

|-
! 
| Burwell Bassett
|  | Democratic-Republican
| 18051812 18151819 1821
| Incumbent re-elected.
| nowrap | 

|-
! 
| Andrew Stevenson
|  | Democratic-Republican
| 1821
| Incumbent re-elected.
| nowrap | 

|-
! 
| colspan=3 | None (District created)
|  | New seat.New member elected.Democratic-Republican gain.
| nowrap | 

|-
! 
| Philip P. Barbour
|  | Democratic-Republican
| 1814 
| Incumbent re-elected.
| nowrap | 

|-
! 
| Robert S. Garnett
|  | Democratic-Republican
| 1817
| Incumbent re-elected.
| nowrap | 

|-
! 
| William Lee Ball
|  | Democratic-Republican
| 1817
| Incumbent re-elected.
| nowrap | 

|-
! 
| Charles F. Mercer
|  | Federalist
| 1817
|  | Re-electedas Democratic-Republican
| nowrap | 

|-
! 
| colspan=3 | None (District created)
|  | New seat.New member elected.Democratic-Republican gain.
| nowrap | 

|-
! 
| James Stephenson
|  | Federalist
| 18031805 18091811 1822 
| Incumbent re-elected.
| nowrap | 

|-
! 
| Jared Williams
|  | Democratic-Republican
| 1819
| Incumbent re-elected.
| nowrap | 

|-
! 
| colspan=3 | None (District created)
|  | New seat.New member elected.Democratic-Republican gain.
| nowrap | 

|-
! 
| William McCoy
|  | Democratic-Republican
| 1811
| Incumbent re-elected.
| nowrap | 

|-
! 
| John Floyd
|  | Democratic-Republican
| 1817
| Incumbent re-elected.
| nowrap | 

|-
! 
| William Smith
|  | Democratic-Republican
| 1821
| Incumbent re-elected.
| nowrap | 

|-
! 
| Alexander Smyth
|  | Democratic-Republican
| 1817
| Incumbent re-elected.
| nowrap | 

|}

Non-voting delegates 

There were three territories with the right to send delegates to the 18th Congress.

|-
! 
| James Woodson Bates
|  | None
| 1819
| Incumbent retired.New member elected.
| nowrap | 

|-
! rowspan=2 | 
| colspan=3 | New seat
| Territory was organized March 30, 1822 and granted the right to send a delegate.New member elected September 30, 1822.Successor seated January 23, 1823 as the first Hispanic American in Congress.Was not re-elected to the next term.
| nowrap | 

|-
| Joseph M. Hernández
|  | Democratic-Republican
| 1822
|  | Incumbent lost re-election.New member elected.Democratic-Republican hold.
| nowrap | 

|-
! 
| Solomon Sibley
|  | Unknown
| 1820 
| Incumbent retired.New member elected in 1823.
| nowrap | 

|}

See also
 1822 United States elections
 List of United States House of Representatives elections (1789–1822)
 1822–23 United States Senate elections
 17th United States Congress
 18th United States Congress

Notes

References

Bibliography

External links
 Office of the Historian (Office of Art & Archives, Office of the Clerk, U.S. House of Representatives)